The Thames Torso Murders, often called the Thames Mysteries or the Embankment Murders, were a sequence of unsolved murders of women occurring in London, England from 1887 to 1889. The series included four incidents which were filed as belonging to the same series. None of the cases were solved, and only one of the four victims was identified. In addition, other murders of a similar kind, taking place between 1873 and 1902, have also been associated with the same murder series. 

Speculations have linked the Thames murder series to that of the contemporary Whitechapel murders and Jack the Ripper. However, the modus operandi of the perpetrator of the Thames Torso Murders differs from the other unidentified criminal in that the victims of Jack the Ripper suffered progressive abdominal- and genital-area mutilation, whereas the Thames Torso Murderer dismembered the bodies of his victims.

The canonical four 
The series included four incidents which were filed as belonging to the same series. These cases were the Rainham Mystery, the Whitehall Mystery, the murder of Elizabeth Jackson, and the Pinchin Street Torso Murder.

Rainham Mystery
Between May and June 1887, the remains of a woman's body were found in the River Thames near Rainham. Workers first encountered a bundle with the torso of a female. Throughout May and June, various parts of the same body were found, with the exception of the head and upper chest.

The investigation concluded that the body had not been dissected for medical purpose, but that a degree of medical knowledge had been necessary to perform the dissection. Because the doctors could not state a cause of death, the jury was forced to return a verdict of "Found Dead".

Whitehall Mystery

Between 11 September and 17 October 1888, the dismembered remains of a woman were discovered at three different sites in the centre of the city, including the future site of Scotland Yard, the police's headquarters. The torso was matched by police surgeon Thomas Bond to a right arm and shoulder that had previously been discovered on the muddy shore of the River Thames in Pimlico on 11 September. The Times newspaper had initially suspected that the arm was placed in the water as a medical students' prank. On 17 October 1888, reporter Jasper Waring used a Spitsbergen dog, with the permission of the police and the help of a labourer, to find a left leg cut above the knee that was buried near the construction site.

Elizabeth Jackson
On 4 June 1889, a female torso was found in the Thames, and more body parts were soon found in the Thames the next week.

The Times reported on 11 June that the remains found so far "are as follows: Tuesday, left leg and thigh off Battersea, lower part of the abdomen at Horsleydown; Thursday, the liver near Nine Elms, upper part of the body in Battersea Park, neck and shoulders off Battersea; Friday, right foot and part of leg at Wandsworth, left leg and foot at Limehouse; Saturday, left arm and hand at Bankside, buttocks and pelvis off Battersea, right thigh at Chelsea Embankment, yesterday, right arm and hand at Bankside."
The investigation concluded that medical knowledge had been necessary to perform the dismemberment. At the inquest held by Mr Braxton Hicks on 17 June, it was stated: "the division of the parts showed skill and design: not, however, the anatomical skill of a surgeon, but the practical knowledge of a butcher or a knacker. There was a great similarity between the condition, as regarded cutting up, of the remains and that of those found at Rainham, and at the new police building on the Thames Embankment." The Times of 5 June reported that "in the opinion of the doctors the women had been dead only 48 hours, and the body had been dissected somewhat roughly by a person who must have had some knowledge of the joints of the human body."

She was about eight months pregnant. The doctors were also this time unable to establish a cause of death. The jury, however, reached the decision of "Wilful murder against some person or persons unknown".

Though the head was never found, the victim was identified as Elizabeth Jackson, a homeless prostitute from Chelsea.

Pinchin Street Torso Murder

On 10 September 1889, Police Constable William Pennett found the headless and legless torso of an unidentified woman under a railway arch at Pinchin Street, Whitechapel. It seems probable that the murder was committed elsewhere and that parts of the dismembered body were dispersed for disposal.

A woman's torso was found at 5:15 a.m. on Tuesday 10 September 1889 under a railway arch in Pinchin Street, Whitechapel. Extensive bruising about the victim's back, hip, and arm indicated that she had been severely beaten shortly before her death, which had occurred approximately one day prior to the discovery of her torso. The victim's abdomen was also extensively mutilated in a manner reminiscent of the Ripper, although her genitals had not been wounded. The dismembered sections of the body are believed to have been transported to the railway arch, hidden under an old chemise. The age of the victim was estimated at 30–40 years. Despite a search of the area, no other sections of her body were ever found, and neither the victim nor the culprit were ever identified.

Chief Inspector Swanson and Commissioner Monro observed that the presence of blood within the torso indicated that death was not from haemorrhage or cutting of the throat. The pathologists, however, said that the general bloodlessness of the tissues and vessels indicated that haemorrhage was the cause of death. Newspaper speculation that the body belonged to Lydia Hart, who had disappeared, was refuted after she was found recovering in hospital after "a bit of a spree". Another claim that the victim was a missing girl called Emily Barker was also refuted, as the torso was from an older and taller woman.

Swanson did not consider this a Ripper case, and instead suggested a link to the Thames Torso Murders in Rainham and Chelsea, as well as the "Whitehall Mystery". Monro agreed with Swanson's assessment. These three murders and the Pinchin Street case are suggested to be the work of a serial killer, nicknamed the "Torso killer", who could either be the same person as "Jack the Ripper" or a separate killer of uncertain connection. Links between these and three further murders—the "Battersea Mystery" of 1873 and 1874, in which two women were found dismembered, and the 1884 "Tottenham Court Road Mystery"—have also been postulated. Experts on the murders, such as Stewart Evans, Keith Skinner, Martin Fido, and Donald Rumbelow, discount any connection between the torso and Ripper killings on the basis of their different modi operandi.

Monro was replaced as Commissioner by Sir Edward Bradford on 21 June 1890, after a disagreement with the Home Secretary Henry Matthews over police pensions.

Associated cases
Outside the four canonical cases which were filed by the police as belonging to the same series, there were additional cases which have been linked to the Thames Torso Murders.

Battersea Mystery
The Battersea Mystery is the name given to two unsolved murders that took place in London in 1873–74.

On 5 September 1873, the left quarter of a woman's trunk was discovered by a Thames Police patrol near Battersea. Subsequently, a right breast was found at Nine Elms, a head at Limehouse, a left forearm at Battersea, a pelvis at Woolwich, until an almost complete body of a dismembered woman had been found. The nose and the chin had been cut from the face, and the head had been scalped.

Under the leadership of the Acting Chief Surgeon, Metropolitan Police, Thomas Bond, the corpse was reconstructed. The attempts to identify the remains were disturbed by the curiosity of the public, and the police first showed a photograph to any potential witness.

The Lancet reported:

The jury passed a verdict of "Wilful murder against some person or persons unknown". The case remained unsolved, in spite of a £200 reward being offered for information.

In June 1874, the dismembered body of a female was discovered in the River Thames at Putney. The corpse lacked a head, both arms, one leg, and had been treated with lime before being thrown in the river. The jury returned an open verdict. The case remained unsolved.

Tottenham Court Road and Bedford Square Mystery 
The Tottenham Court Road Mystery was reported by The Times on 24 October 1884, relating to the discovery of parts of a woman's body:

 A skull, still with flesh attached to it
 A chunk of flesh from a thighbone.

Near Tottenham Court Road, in Bedford Square, a woman's arm was found in a parcel. This arm had been tattooed, showing that it might have belonged to a prostitute.

A human torso was found in a parcel by a police constable as he passed 33 Fitzroy Square five days later. The parcel was believed to have been placed at the location between the hours of 10:00 and 10:15.

Evidence was presented in an inquest on 11 November, held at St Giles Coroner's Court. This concluded that the body parts came from a woman and that they might have been divided by someone who was skilled, but not for the purpose of anatomy.

The inquest resumed on 9 December. More evidence was presented and showed how the body was skilfully dissected and came from a woman, as stated by Dr Jenkins. This evidence was the right arm, both feet, and the right forearm of a single individual.

These two mysteries still remain unsolved.

Le mystere de Montrouge and Lambeth Mystery 

In his 2002 book The Thames Torso Murders of Victorian London, R. Michael Gordon suggests there may be a link to a murder in Paris in 1886, as well as to another murder in London in 1902. 

In November 1886, a woman's torso was found on the steps of the Montrouge church in Paris, missing the head, legs, right arm, left breast and uterus. 

In June 1902 a woman's torso was found in Salamanca Alley in Lambeth in London. 

No suspect was identified in either case.

Speculation

Newspapers suggested a tie to Jack the Ripper's killings that were occurring simultaneously, but the Metropolitan Police said there was no connection. It is debatable whether Jack the Ripper and the "Torso killer" were the same person or separate serial killers active in the same area. The modus operandi of the Torso killer differed from that of the Ripper, and police at the time discounted any connection between the two.

Fiction
In the opening scenes of "The King Came Calling", the third episode of the first series of the television programme Ripper Street, which takes place in 1889, Edmund Reid (Matthew Macfadyen) conducts an experiment to try and discover where Elizabeth Jackson's remains were dumped into the river; the ambiguity over Jackson's "provenance" leads to a dispute with Reid's opposite number in the City of London Police, who wants jurisdiction over the case.
 The 2013 novel Mayhem by Sarah Pinborough is based on the Thames Torso murders and includes newspaper articles from that time. Some of the characters are based on the people involved with the investigation.

See also
 Cleveland Torso Murders, another series of murders in which the torsos of victims were left behind
 List of serial killers in the United Kingdom
 List of fugitives from justice who disappeared

References

Citations

Bibliography

Further reading
 
 
 
 M.J. Trow : The Thames Torso Murders, 2011
 R. Michael Gordon :The Thames Torso Murders of Victorian London, 2015

External links

"The Thames Torso Murders of 1887-89", by Gerard Spicer, at Casebook.org.

1887 deaths
1887 in London
1888 in London
1889 in London
1887 murders in the United Kingdom
1888 murders in the United Kingdom
1889 murders in the United Kingdom 
1880s murders in London 
19th century in the City of Westminster
Female murder victims
Fugitives
Jack the Ripper
Murder in London
Serial murders in the United Kingdom
Unidentified murder victims in the United Kingdom
Unidentified British serial killers
Unsolved murders in England
Violence against women in the United Kingdom
Women in London